Port Arthur was a federal electoral district represented in the House of Commons of Canada from 1935 to 1979. It was located in the province of Ontario. This riding was created in 1933 from parts of Port Arthur—Thunder Bay riding.

It consisted initially of the parts of the territorial districts of Algoma, Cochrane, Kenora, and Thunder Bay not included in the electoral districts of Algoma West, Cochrane, Fort William, and Kenora-Rainy River herein defined, and including the city of Port Arthur, together with that part of the district of Patricia not included in the electoral districts of Kenora—Rainy River and Cochrane.

In 1966, it was defined as consisting of the part of the territorial district of Thunder Bay contained in the City of Port Arthur and the Townships of Adrian, Blackwell, Conmee, Forbes, Fowler, Goldie, Gorham, Horne, Jacques, Laurie, MacGregor, McIntyre, McTavish, Oliver, Sackville, Sibley and Ware.

The electoral district was abolished in 1976 when it was merged into Thunder Bay—Nipigon riding.

Members of Parliament

Port Arthur has elected the following Members of Parliament:

Election results

|- 
  
|Liberal
|C. D. Howe
|align="right"| 6,591   
  
|Conservative
|George Wardrope
|align="right"| 2,807    
 
|Co-operative Commonwealth
|Alex Gibson
|align="right"| 1,357   

  
|}

|- 
  
|Liberal
|C. D. Howe
|align="right"| 10,327   

|National Government
|Alan A. Barton
|align="right"| 5,213    
 
|Co-operative Commonwealth
|Alex Gibson
|align="right"|3,128   
|}

|- 
  
|Liberal
|C.D. Howe
|align="right"|10,045   
 
|Co-operative Commonwealth
|John Arthur Thompson
|align="right"|5,504   
  
|Progressive Conservative
|George Wardrope
|align="right"| 3,516    

|}

|- 
  
|Liberal
|C. D. Howe
|align="right"| 12,646   
 
|Co-operative Commonwealth
|James Thomas Cawley
|align="right"|  6,401   
  
|Progressive Conservative
|Robert Ainslie Robinson
|align="right"|5,068    

|}

|- 
  
|Liberal
|C. D. Howe
|align="right"| 12,272   
 
|Co-operative Commonwealth
|Ronald Vincent Wilmot
|align="right"| 5,865   
  
|Progressive Conservative
|Bob Robinson
|align="right"| 5,415    

|}

|- 
 
|Co-operative Commonwealth
|Doug Fisher
|align="right"|  12,228   
  
|Liberal
|C. D. Howe
|align="right"|10,813   
  
|Progressive Conservative
|Ina M. Vigars
|align="right"|5,261    
|}

|- 
 
|Co-operative Commonwealth
|Doug Fisher 
|align="right"| 12,217   
  
|Progressive Conservative
|Norman R. Wilson
|align="right"|  10,215    
  
|Liberal
|Edward V. Anten
|align="right"|9,043   
|}

|- 
 
|New Democratic
|Doug Fisher
|align="right"|13,437    
  
|Liberal
|David W. Morgan
|align="right"| 11,502   
  
|Progressive Conservative
|Norman R. Wilson
|align="right"| 9,226    

|}

|- 
 
|New Democratic
|Doug Fisher
|align="right"| 16,141    
  
|Liberal
|Saul Laskin
|align="right"| 13,132   
  
|Progressive Conservative
|Harvey W. Smith
|align="right"| 6,316    
|}

|- 
  
|Liberal
|Bob Andras
|align="right"| 14,706   
 
|New Democratic
|Gordon Oliver Rothney
|align="right"| 12,275    
  
|Progressive Conservative
|Harvey Smith
|align="right"| 8,075    
|}

|- 
  
|Liberal
|Bob Andras 
|align="right"| 11,079   
 
|New Democratic
|Gordon Oliver Rothney
|align="right"|7,306    
  
|Progressive Conservative
|Carl Rogers
|align="right"| 4,179    

|}

|- 
  
|Liberal
|Bob Andras
|align="right"| 14,351   
 
|New Democratic
|Chris Ferguson
|align="right"| 6,756    
  
|Progressive Conservative
|John Erickson
|align="right"| 6,027    
 
|No affiliation
|Clifford Wahl 
|align="right"| 274   
|}

|- 
  
|Liberal
|Bob Andras
|align="right"|14,523   
 
|New Democratic
|Dusty Miller
|align="right"| 8,591    
  
|Progressive Conservative
|Frank Wright
|align="right"|3,322    

|}

See also 

 List of Canadian federal electoral districts
 Past Canadian electoral districts

External links 

 Website of the Parliament of Canada

Former federal electoral districts of Ontario
Politics of Thunder Bay